Eldar Sætre (born 8 February 1956) is a Norwegian businessman who since February 2015 is CEO of Equinor, holding the position interim from October 2014.

Early life
Sætre was born in Vartdal in Ørsta, son of a carpenter. He holds a master's degree from Norwegian School of Economics.

Career
He joined Equinor (then Statoil) in 1980. He was central in the listing of the company on the Oslo Stock Exchange and New York Stock Exchange in 2001, following a privatization of Statoil. He has been part of the Executive board since 2003, first as CFO and from 2010 to 2014 as director of Marketing, Processing and Renewable energy. As CFO he played a major role in the merger of Statoil with Hydro Oil & Gas in 2007. He has also been responsible for Statoil's marketing strategy for natural gas sale in Europe.

At the resignation of Helge Lund as CEO in 2014, Sætre was made interim CEO. He denied any interest in taking on the position permanently, but changed his mind after being asked by the board in December 2014.

He is, as of February 2015, a board member of Strømberg Gruppen and Trucknor.

Personal life
He lives in Sandnes.

References

External links 
 Bio at Statoil

1956 births
Living people
Norwegian School of Economics alumni
People in the petroleum industry
Equinor people
Norwegian businesspeople in the oil industry
People from Ørsta
People from Sandnes